Filipino singer Regine Velasquez has recorded material for seventeen studio albums, eight soundtrack albums and five extended plays (EP). She has also collaborated with other artists on duets and featured songs on their respective albums. After signing a record contract with Viva Records in 1987, Velasquez began to work with producers Vic del Rosario and Ronnie Henares, who co-produced all of the songs on her 1987 debut studio album Regine. Christine Bendebel wrote the tracks "Kung Maibabalik Ko Lang" and "Urong Sulong", while Awit Award-winning songwriter Vehnee Saturno co-wrote "Isang Lahi". Del Rosario and Henares also co-produced Velasquez's second studio album Nineteen 90 (1990); its lead single "Narito Ako" was written by Nonong Pedero and was originally recorded and performed by Maricris Belmont as an entry for the 1978 Metro Manila Popular Music Festival.

Tagala Talaga, Velasquez's third studio album, was released in October 1991 and featured cover versions of Filipino songs written by National Artist for Music recipients Ryan Cayabyab, Lucio San Pedro and Levi Celerio. The record's lead single "Buhay Ng Buhay Ko" was written by Pedero and was originally recorded by Leah Navarro. Two more singles, "Anak" and "Sa Ugoy Ng Duyan", were released in 1992 from Tagala Tagala. Velasquez released her fourth studio album Reason Enough in 1993. On it, she recorded a duet with Canadian singer Paul Anka for the record's first single "It's Hard to Say Goodbye", marking her first musical collaboration with an international artist. She also worked with Gary Valenciano, who co-wrote the album's second single "Sana Maulit Muli", which won the Awit Award for Best Performance by a Female Recording Artist in 1994.

After signing with Polygram Records, Velasquez began working on her fifth studio album Listen Without Prejudice, which was released in 1994 and established her commercial music career in Southeast and East Asia. Different writers and producers, including Glenn Medeiros, John Laudon and Michael Au, significantly contributed to the album, writing and producing five songs among them. The critical and commercial success of Listen Without Prejudice was aided by the lead single "In Love With You", a duet recorded with Jacky Cheung. Velasquez subsequently released her sixth studio album My Love Emotion in 1995; Southern Sons' lead vocalist Phil Buckle wrote the album's title track. Velasquez also collaborated with Kazufumi Miyazawa and Mariya Takeuchi on three of the record's singles and recorded a cover version of British folk band Fairground Attraction's 1988 song "Perfect". The singer's seventh studio album Retro (1996) was aided by the release of several cover versions of international material, as well as of its lead single "Fly"—the only original song on the record. Maurice White, Al McKay and Allee Willis, members of the American disco-soul group Earth, Wind & Fire, are credited as songwriters due to the interpolation of the melody of their 1978 song "September". Velasquez's eight studio album Drawn (1998) marked her collaboration with executive producer Mark Feist, who also received songwriting and musical arrangement credits on the effort. In addition to Feist, Velasquez also worked with new songwriters, such as Charlotte Gibson and Shanice Wilson.

Velasquez's tenth studio album R2K was released in November 1999. A cover album, it contained the singles "I Don't Want to Miss a Thing" (1998) by Aerosmith, "The Long and Winding Road" (1970) by the Beatles, "I'll Never Love This Way Again" (1979) by Dionne Warwick and "Music and Me" (1973) by Michael Jackson. The album has since been certified twelve times Platinum by the Philippine Association of the Record Industry (PARI). Following a two-year break, Velasquez released her eleventh studio album Reigne in 2001. She worked with producer Tats Faustino, who wrote "Dadalhin", and collaborated with singer Janno Gibbs for the ballad "Sa Aking Pag-iisa". The singer's succeeding records—Covers. Vol 1 (2004), Covers, Vol. 2 (2006), Low Key (2008) and Fantasy (2010)—were cover albums. As executive producer of these albums, she enlisted longtime collaborators Jay Durias, Raul Mitra, and Gerard Salonga. In 2013 she released her sixteenth studio album Hulog Ka Ng Langit, her first original material since Reigne. Its lead single was the title track of the album, and was followed by "Nathaniel (Gift of God)" and "Hele ni Inay". Velasquez's seventeenth studio album R3.0 was released in 2017; this triple CD set included the singles "Tadhana" and "Hugot". In addition to her music career, Velasquez has starred in films and recorded songs for her soundtrack albums. She further collaborated with Louie Ocampo on the songs "I Can" from Do Re Mi, and "You Are My Song" from Wanted Perfect Mother, while Ogie Alcasid wrote and produced several singles, including "Kailangan Ko'y Ikaw", "Pangako" and "Hanggang Ngayon".

Songs

Notes

References

Citations

Book sources

External links
 
 
 

Vekasquez, Regine
Songs